Center Independent School District is a public school district based in Center, Texas (USA).

In 2009, the school district was rated "academically acceptable" by the Texas Education Agency.

School Colors - Purple and Gold

School Mascot - Rough Riders

Schools
Center High School (Grades 9-12)
Center Middle School (Grades 6-8)
Center Elementary School (Grades 3-5)
F.L. Moffett Primary School (Grades PK-2)

References

External links
Center ISD

School districts in Shelby County, Texas